Bomet East is a constituency in Kenya. It is one of five constituencies in Bomet County.

References 

Constituencies in Bomet County